is a Japanese term for live action film or television series that makes heavy use of practical special effects. Developed by Godzilla and Ultraman creator Eiji Tsuburaya, Tokusatsu entertainment mainly refers to science fiction, war, fantasy, or horror media featuring such technology but is sometimes dubbed a genre itself. Renowned subgenres of  include kaiju such as the Godzilla and Gamera series; superhero such as the Kamen Rider and Metal Hero series; and mecha like Giant Robo and Super Robot Red Baron. Some  television programs combine several of these subgenres, for example, the Ultraman and Super Sentai series.

 is one of the most popular forms of Japanese entertainment, but only a small proportion of  films and television programs are widely known outside of Japan. Nevertheless, certain properties have attained popularity outside of Japan; Godzilla is featured in popular American-made movies, and the Super Sentai Series was adapted into the Power Rangers series and broadcast internationally beginning in 1993.

History

After researching the special effects featured in King Kong (1933), Eiji Tsuburaya began to develop tokusatsu and had his breakthrough on Princess Kaguya (1935) and The Daughter of the Samurai (1937). Modern , however, did not begin to take shape until the late 1940s, with the conceptual and creative birth of Godzilla, one of the most famous monsters of all time.

Tsuburaya and the director Ishirō Honda became the driving forces behind 1954's Godzilla. Tsuburaya, inspired by the American film King Kong, formulated many of the techniques that would become staples of the genre, such as so-called suitmation—the use of a human actor in a costume to play a giant monster—combined with the use of miniatures and scaled-down city sets. Godzilla forever changed the landscape of Japanese science fiction, fantasy, and cinema by creating a uniquely Japanese vision in a genre typically dominated by American cinema. This film also helped Tsuburaya's employer Toho establish itself as the most successful effects company in the world.

Godzilla kickstarted the  genre in Japan, creating the "Monster Boom", which remained extremely popular for several decades, with characters such as the aforementioned Godzilla, Gamera and King Ghidorah leading the market. However, in 1957 Shintoho produced the first film serial featuring the superhero character Super Giant, signaling a shift in popularity that favored masked heroes over giant monsters called the "Henshin Boom" started by Kamen Rider in 1971, though giant monsters, aliens and humanoid creatures dubbed  remained an integral part of the genre. The following year, Moonlight Mask premiered, the first of numerous televised superhero dramas that would make up one of the most popular  subgenres. Created by Kōhan Kawauchi, he followed up its success with the  superhero shows Seven Color Mask (1959) and Messenger of Allah (1960), both starring a young Sonny Chiba.

These original productions preceded the first color-television  series, Ambassador Magma and Ultraman, which heralded the Kyodai Hero subgenre, wherein a regular-sized protagonist grows to larger proportions to fight equally large monsters. Popular  superhero shows in the 1970s included Kamen Rider (1971), Warrior of Love Rainbowman (1972), Super Sentai (1975, trademarked in 1979) and Spider-Man (1978).

Techniques

Suitmation technology

 is the term used to describe the process in  movies and television programs used to portray a monster using suit acting. The exact origin of the term remains unknown. At the least, it was used to promote the Godzilla suit from The Return of Godzilla.

Franchises and productions

The many productions of  series have general themes common throughout different groups.

Kaiju

productions primarily feature supervillains as their central character. This includes films such as The Invisible Avenger, Half Human, The H-Man, The Secret of the Telegian, and The Human Vapor.

Popular franchises

Since about 1960, several long-running television series have combined various other themes. Tsuburaya Productions has had the Ultraman Series starting with Ultra Q and Ultraman in 1966. P Productions began their foray into  in 1966 with the series Ambassador Magma. They also had involvement in the Lion-Maru series which concluded in November 2006.

Toei Company has several series that fall under their Toei Superheroes category of programming, starting in 1958 with the film series, Moonlight Mask. Then, they produced several other long-running series, starting with Shotaro Ishinomori's Kamen Rider Series in 1971, the Super Sentai series in 1975, the Metal Hero Series in 1982, and the Toei Fushigi Comedy Series in 1981. Toei also produced several other television series based on Ishinomori's works, including Android Kikaider and Kikaider 01, Robot Detective, Inazuman and Inazuman Flash, and Kaiketsu Zubat. Toei was also involved in the Spider-Man television series, which influenced their subsequent Super Sentai series. In 2003, TV Asahi began broadcasting the Super Sentai and Kamen Rider series in a one-hour block airing each week known as Super Hero Time. Toho, the creators of Godzilla, also had their hands in creating the Chouseishin Series of programs from 2003 to 2006 and the Zone Fighter franchise.

In 2006, Keita Amemiya's Garo, a mature late-night tokusatsu drama was released, starting a franchise composed of several television series and films. Other mature late-night series followed, including a revival of Lion-Maru in Lion-Maru G, the Daimajin Kanon television series (based on the Daimajin film series), and Shougeki Gouraigan!! (also created by Amemiya).

movies
Various movies classified as  can include disaster movies and science fiction films.

Similar productions

Non-traditional  productions
Non-traditional  films and television programs may not use conventional special effects or may not star human actors. Though situation typifies , some productions may use stop-motion to animate their monsters instead, for example Majin Hunter Mitsurugi in 1973. TV shows may use traditional  techniques, but are cast with puppets or marionettes: Uchuusen Silica (1960); Ginga Shonen Tai (1963); Kuchuu Toshi 008 (1969); and Go Nagai's X Bomber (1980). Some  may employ animation in addition to its live-action components: Tsuburaya Productions' Dinosaur Expedition Team Bornfree (1976), Dinosaur War Izenborg (1977) and Pro-Wrestling Star Aztekaiser (1976).

Japanese fan films
As the popularity of  increased in Japan, several fan film projects have been produced over the years. Hideaki Anno, Yoshiyuki Sadamoto, Takami Akai, and Shinji Higuchi set up a fan-based group called Daicon Film, which they renamed Gainax in 1985 and turned into an animation studio. Besides anime sequences, they also produced a series of  shorts parodying monster movies and superhero shows. These productions include Swift Hero Noutenki (1982), Patriotic Squadron Dai-Nippon (1983), Return of Ultraman (1983) and The Eight-Headed Giant Serpent Strikes Back (1985).

Outside of Japan
 techniques have spread outside Japan due to the popularity of Godzilla films.

Adaptations
Godzilla, King of the Monsters! first appeared in English in 1956. Rather than a simple dub of the Japanese-language original, this work represented an entirely re-edited version that restructured the plot to incorporate a new character played by a native English-speaking actor, Raymond Burr. Ultraman gained popularity when United Artists dubbed it for American audiences in the 1960s.

In the 1990s, Haim Saban acquired the distribution rights for the Super Sentai series from Toei Company and combined the original Japanese action footage with new footage featuring American actors, resulting in the Power Rangers franchise which has continued since then into sequel TV series (with Power Rangers Beast Morphers premiering in 2019 and Power Rangers Cosmic Fury set to premier in 2023), comic books, video games, and three feature films, with a further cinematic universe planned. Following from the success of Power Rangers, Saban acquired the rights to more of Toei's library, creating VR Troopers and Big Bad Beetleborgs from several Metal Hero Series shows and Masked Rider from Kamen Rider Series footage. DIC Entertainment joined this boom by acquiring the rights to Gridman the Hyper Agent and turning it into Superhuman Samurai Syber-Squad.

In 2002, 4Kids Entertainment bought the rights to Ultraman Tiga, but simply produced a dub of the Japanese footage, broadcast on the Fox Box. And in 2009, Adness Entertainment took 2002's Kamen Rider Ryuki and turned it into Kamen Rider: Dragon Knight, which began broadcast on The CW4Kids in 2009. It won the first Daytime Emmy for "Outstanding Stunt Coordination" for its original scenes.

Original productions
In 1961 England-based filmmakers produced the Godzilla-style film, Gorgo, which used the same situation technique as the Godzilla films. That same year, Saga Studios in Denmark made another Godzilla-style giant monster film, Reptilicus, bringing its monster to life using a marionette on a miniature set. In 1967, South Korea produced its monster movie titled Yonggary. In 1975, Shaw Brothers produced a superhero film called The Super Inframan, based on the huge success of Ultraman and Kamen Rider there. The film starred Danny Lee in the title role. Although there were several similar superhero productions in Hong Kong, The Super Inframan came first. With help from Japanese special effects artists under Sadamasa Arikawa, they also produced a Japanese-styled monster movie, The Mighty Peking Man, in 1977.

Concurrent with their work on Superhuman Samurai Syber-Squad, DIC attempted an original concept based on the popularity of Power Rangers in 1994's Tattooed Teenage Alien Fighters from Beverly Hills. In 1998, a video from an attempted Power Rangers-styled adaptation of Sailor Moon surfaced, combining original footage of American actresses with original animated sequences. 

Saban also attempted to make their own unique  series entitled Mystic Knights of Tir Na Nog, set in medieval Ireland and featured four, later five knights who transform using the power of the elements (for the most part) at they protected their kingdom from evil. Saban had also produced the live-action Teenage Mutant Ninja Turtles series Ninja Turtles: The Next Mutation, which was known in the turtles' fandom for introducing a female turtle exclusive to that series called Venus de Milo and eliminating the fact that the other turtles were brothers. The show mostly featured actors in costumes, but featured similar choreographed fights like other  shows.

In the 2000s, production companies in other East Asian countries began producing their own original -inspired television series: Thailand's Sport Ranger and South Korea's Erexion in 2006; the Philippines' Zaido: Pulis Pangkalawakan (itself a sanctioned spinoff of Toei's Space Sheriff Shaider) in 2007; China's Armor Hero in 2008, Battle Strike Team: Giant Saver in 2012, Metal Kaiser; and Indonesia's Bima Satria Garuda which began in 2013.

On July the 1st, 2019, Vietnam's Transform Studio co-operating with Dive Into Eden announced their own original  series, Mighty Guardian. The first season in the series is Mighty Guardian: Lost Avian, using Vietnamese Mythologies as the main concept.

Influence
Kaiju and  films, notably Warning from Space (1956), sparked Stanley Kubrick's interest in science fiction films and influenced 2001: A Space Odyssey (1968). According to his biographer John Baxter, despite their "clumsy model sequences, the films were often well-photographed in colour ... and their dismal dialogue was delivered in well-designed and well-lit sets."

Steven Spielberg cited Godzilla as an inspiration for Jurassic Park (1993), specifically Godzilla, King of the Monsters! (1956), which he grew up watching. During its production, Spielberg described Godzilla as "the most masterful of all the dinosaur movies because it made you believe it was really happening." Godzilla also influenced the Spielberg film Jaws (1975).

Japanese  movies also influenced one of the first video games, Spacewar! (1961), inspiring its science fiction theme. According to the game's programmer Martin Graetz, "we would be off to one of Boston's seedier cinemas to view the latest trash from Toho" as Japanese studios "churned out a steady diet of cinematic junk food of which Rodan and Godzilla are only the best-known examples."

Homage and parody
In 2001, Buki X-1 Productions, a French fan-based production company, produced its own series, Jushi Sentai France Five (now called Shin Kenjushi France Five), a tribute to Toei's long running Super Sentai series. The low-budget television series Kaiju Big Battel directly parodies monster and Kyodai Hero films and series by immersing their own costumed characters in professional wrestling matches among cardboard buildings. In 2006, Mighty Moshin' Emo Rangers premiered on the internet as a Power Rangers spoof, but was quickly picked up by MTV UK for broadcast. In 2006, Insector Sun, a low-budget tribute to Kamen Rider was produced by Brazilian fans.

Peyton Reed, the director of the Ant-Man films in the Marvel Cinematic Universe, said that Ant-Man's costume design was influenced by two  superheroes, Ultraman and Inframan.

References

Further reading

 
 
 
 
 
  AKA Japan's Favorite Mon-Star: The Unauthorized Biography of Godzilla.
 

 
Japanese entertainment terms
Japanese words and phrases
Otaku